Sharp were an English new wave band active during the mid-1980s, featuring former Jam members Bruce Foxton and Rick Buckler. They released one standalone single, in 1986.

History
After the Jam broke up in 1982, Bruce Foxton pursued a solo career and Rick Buckler formed Time UK, featuring Jimmy Edwards on vocals. After a stop-start career that took over two years to release three singles, and a rapid dwindling of the initial public interest in the band, they effectively broke up.

Foxton, finding his solo career had followed a similar path to Time UK's, recorded several tracks with Buckler and Edwards. A standalone single, "Entertain Me", was released on the independent record label, Unicorn-Kanchana in 1986.

Tracks from the release were included on a 2002 Time UK compilation album, One More Time.

Band members
Rick Buckler – drums
Jimmy Edwards – vocals
Bruce Foxton – bass guitar, backing vocals

Discography
"Entertain Me"/"So Say Hurrah" (7", Unicorn PHZ5), 1986
"Entertain Me"/"So Say Hurrah"/"Next Generation" (12", Unicorn 12PHZ5), 1986
One More Time (Time UK compilation album, Detour DRCD041), 2002

References

External links
Time UK site

English new wave musical groups
Musical groups established in 1985
1985 establishments in England